is a Japanese former para table tennis player. He and his doubles partner Yasunori Igari won Japan's first ever Paralympic gold medal at the 1964 Summer Paralympics.

When he was 22 years old, he had a spinal cord injury while unloading a log from a truck.

References 

Sportspeople from Fukushima Prefecture
1939 births
Paralympic medalists in table tennis
Living people
Table tennis players at the 1964 Summer Paralympics
Medalists at the 1964 Summer Paralympics
Paralympic gold medalists for Japan
Paralympic table tennis players of Japan
People with paraplegia
Japanese male table tennis players